John James Doolan (May 16, 1919 – March 23, 2002) was an American football running back in the National Football League for the Washington Redskins, the New York Giants, and the Chicago Cardinals. He played college football at Georgetown University.

External links

1919 births
2002 deaths
People from Brooklyn
American football running backs
Washington Redskins players
New York Giants players
Chicago Cardinals players
Georgetown Hoyas football players
St. Cecilia High School (New Jersey) alumni